Grand Ayatollah Sayyid Mohammad Ezodin Hosseini Zanjani (1 November 1921 – 14 May 2013) was an Iranian Twelver Shi'a Marja'. He studied in seminaries of Qom, Iran under Grand Ayatollah Seyyed Hossein Borujerdi and Ruhollah Khomeini, and also in seminaries of Najaf, Iraq under Grand Ayatollah Abul-Qassim Khoei.

Life
Ayatollah Mohammad ezodin zanjani was born in 1921 - in a religious and learned family - in Zanjan (iran).he was trained under supervision of his father (mirza mahmoud Hosseini zanjani).at the same time the master mirza mehdikhan vaziri taught him academic education and French language.it is considerable that before foundation of Qom seminary (in Iran) (hozeye-e-elmiyeh) by ayatollah hayery the other seminaries like zanjani's seminary were active and had particular situation in Iran.
scholars like ayatollah fazel lankarani (father of present lankarani); ayatollah rafea ghazvini who is all professional in jurisprudence, philosophy and basic lessons (osool) graduated from zanjan's seminary.

Notes

Sources
biography of ayatollah zanzani - written by : Bagher hosseini zanjani - translator: Mohammad sahabeh

External links
Biography in Persian

See also

List of Maraji
List of Ayatollahs

Iranian Islamists
Shia Islamists
1921 births
2013 deaths
People from Zanjan, Iran
Iranian ayatollahs
Burials at Imam Reza Shrine